The 30th Indian Infantry Brigade was an infantry brigade of the British Indian Army that saw active service in the Indian Army during World War II. It served as a lines of communications formation in Iraq.

History
The 30th Indian Infantry Brigade was formed on 15 January 1943, by the redesignation of HQ Baghdad Line of Communications Sub Area to conform with the reorganization of Paiforce.  It formed part of 2nd Indian Infantry Division and was converted into HQ 2nd Indian Infantry Division in August 1943.

Order of battle
The brigade included the following units in the Second World War:
 21st King George V's Own Horse (15 January 1943 to 14 February 1943)
 2nd Hyderabad Infantry, I.S.F. (15 January 1943 to 14 May 1943)
 30th Brigade Signals Section

Commanders
The 30th Brigade had the following commanders in the Second World War:

See also

 :List of Indian Army Brigades in World War II

References

Bibliography

External links
 

Brigades of India in World War II
Military units and formations established in 1943
Military units and formations disestablished in 1943